Fehrbellin is a municipality in Germany, located 60 km NW of Berlin. It had 9,310 inhabitants as of 2005, but has since declined to 8,606 inhabitants in 2012.

History
In 1675, the Battle of Fehrbellin was fought there, in which the troops of Brandenburg-Prussia defeated those of the occupying Swedish Empire. In 1758 during the Seven Years' War Prussian and Swedish forces clashed at the Battle of Fehrbellin (1758).

One of the most important skydiving dropzones of Germany is located at the local airport.

Municipal divisions

Fehrbellin
Betzin
Brunne
Dechtow
Deutschhof
Hakenberg
Karwesee
Königshorst

Lentzke
Linum
Manker
Protzen
Tarmow
Walchow
Wall
Wustrau-Altfriesack

Wustrau and Altfriesack were amalgamated in 1970. With 1221 residents, the combined municipal division is the largest in the municipality. Altfriesack lies between the Ruppiner See and the Bützsee and belonged to Alt Ruppin until 1872. By area, Fehrbellin is the second-largest rural municipality ("Gemeinde") in Germany, trailing only Nuthe-Urstromtal.

Demography

Sights
 Hakenberg Victory Column
Zietenschloß in Wustrau
Brandenburg-Preußen Museum

Personalities
Hans Joachim von Zieten (1699–1786), Prussian cavalry general, born and buried in Wustrau.
 Hans Ernst Karl, Graf von Zieten (1770–1848), Prussian general field marshal

References

External links

Brandenburg Prussia Museum in Fehrbellin-Wustrau
 

Localities in Ostprignitz-Ruppin